Estonian Tennis Association (abbreviation ETA) is one of the sport governing bodies in Estonia which deals with tennis.

ETA was established in 1922 and re-established in 1991. ETA is a member of International Tennis Federation (ITF).

The president of ETA is Enn Pant.

References

External links
 

Sports governing bodies in Estonia
Tennis in Estonia
National members of Tennis Europe
Sports organizations established in 1922